Ralph Anthony Charles de Boissière (6 October 1907 – 16 February 2008) was a Trinidad-born Australian social realist novelist. Described as "an outspoken opponent of racism, injustice, greed and corruption, a passionate humanist with a vision of a just society", he was the author of four novels although most acclaimed for the first two: Crown Jewel and Rum and Coca-Cola, both originally published in the 1950s. A fifth novel called Homeless in Paradise remains unpublished.

Biography 
Ralph de Boissière was born in Port of Spain, Trinidad, the son of Armand de Boissière, a solicitor, and Maude Harper, an Englishwoman who died three weeks later. He attended Queen's Royal College and during this time discovered the Russian authors, Tolstoy, Turgenev, Gorky, Chekhov, Pushkin and Gogol, who were to remain a lasting influence:

Initially he wished to become a concert pianist but on leaving school took a job as a salesman, which enlightened him to the living and working conditions of ordinary Trinidadians. He then became involved in left-wing and trade union politics, campaigning as well as writing. A story of his, "Booze and the Goberdaw", appeared in the 1929 Christmas issue of a short-lived publication called Trinidad, edited by Alfred Mendes and C. L. R. James. De Boissière became part of the group of young writers, including James, who published in Trinidad's first literary magazine The Beacon (March 1931–November 1933), edited by Albert Gomes.

In 1935 he married Ivy Alcantara (died 1984) and they had two daughters. But in 1947, having lost his job and unable to find another one because of his political activities, he and his family left the country for Chicago, afterwards moving to the Australian city of Melbourne in 1948. He found work in Australia as salesman and a factory-hand. Aged 42, de Boissière settled into a clerical job, from which he retired in 1980.

In Australia he joined the Communist Party and had his first novel, Crown Jewel, published in 1952 by the leftist Australasian Realist Writers. Like all his work this depicts the struggles of the working class with realistic sympathy, culminating with a portrayal of a 1937 strike in Trinidad brutally put down by police shooting. He subsequently wrote four more novels and has been translated into Polish, German, Russian, Bulgarian, Romanian, Czech and Chinese. His work has been described by one critic as "combin[ing] social realism and political commitment with a concern for the culture of the feeling within the individual in a way that is unique not only among West Indian writers but among writers with a social conscience anywhere in the world."

The literary archive of Ralph de Boissière is held at the National Library of Australia (Papers of Ralph de Boissière) and comprises his manuscripts, "typescripts of his novels and screenplays; diaries; correspondence; reviews; and, photographic prints and negatives."

Personal life 
In 2007, his centenary year, Ralph de Boissière married his longtime companion, Dr. Annie Greet, his fourth novel, Call of the Rainbow, was published in Melbourne, and in November, he received an honorary Doctor of Literature from the University of Trinidad and Tobago. His autobiography, Life on the Edge, was posthumously published (edited and introduced by Kenneth Ramchand) in 2010.

Death 
De Boissière died in Melbourne on 16 February 2008, aged 100.

Bibliography

Novels 
 Crown Jewel (Australasian Book Society, 1952; London: Allison and Busby, 1981)
 Rum and Coca-Cola (Australasian Book Society, 1956; Allison and Busby, 1984)
 No Saddles for Kangaroos (Australasian Book Society, 1964)
 Call of the Rainbow (Melbourne: L.A. Browne, 2007)

Unpublished:
 Homeless in Paradise

Autobiography
 The Autobiography of Ralph de Boissière: Life on the Edge (Caroni, Trinidad: Lexicon, 2010)

References

External links 
 Citation for honorary degree
 The Papers of Ralph de Boissière are held at the National Library of Australia.

1907 births
2008 deaths
20th-century Australian male writers
20th-century Australian novelists
21st-century Australian male writers
21st-century Australian novelists
Alumni of Queen's Royal College, Trinidad
Australian centenarians
Australian male novelists
Communist Party of Australia members
Marxist writers
Men centenarians
People from Port of Spain
Trinidad and Tobago communists
Trinidad and Tobago emigrants to Australia
Trinidad and Tobago male writers
Trinidad and Tobago novelists
Trinidad and Tobago people of English descent
Trinidad and Tobago people of French descent